Cosmotoma viridana is a species of longhorn beetles of the subfamily Lamiinae. It was described by Lacordaire in 1872, and is known from southeastern Brazil and Paraguay.

References

Beetles described in 1872
Cosmotoma